Christopher Malone (born 17 March 1990 in Glasgow, Scotland) is a Scottish footballer who last played for Petershill.

Honours
Livingston FC
Scottish Football League Third Division: 2009/10
Scottish Football League Second Division: 2010/11

External links

References

1990 births
Living people
Scottish footballers
Scottish Football League players
Livingston F.C. players
Airdrieonians F.C. players
Kilbirnie Ladeside F.C. players
Glenafton Athletic F.C. players
Petershill F.C. players
Footballers from Glasgow
Association football midfielders
Scottish Junior Football Association players